Felix Township is a township in Grundy County, Iowa.

History
Felix Township, Grundy County, is named for Felix Grundy, Senator from Tennessee.

References

Populated places in Grundy County, Iowa
Townships in Iowa